Johannes Phokela (born 1966) is a South African painter and sculptor.

Background
Johannes Phokela was born in Soweto, South Africa in 1966 and trained under Durant Sihlali.

When Phokela was a child he witnessed the Soweto uprising and later created memorials regarding the event, including a statue of Teboho MacDonald Mashinini on the grounds of Morris Isaacson High School unveiled on 1 May 2010, and a large sculptural mural of a book sitting in a lot opposite of the school.

Phokela began his studies at the Federated Union of Black Artists, Johannesburg before concluding his studies at the Royal College of Art, London.

Phokela has lived and worked in both London and Johannesburg.

Career
Phokela's artistic practice is primarily composed of oil on canvas painting in the style of older Dutch Golden Age painting, often Phokela's paintings will include white grids as well.

On the topic of the production of art, Phokela had stated "Once you have the work it doesn’t really matter who produced it what counts is the quality. But unfortunately, the contemporary international art scene has this tendency to dwell on the background of the artist”

Exhibitions

 Johannes Phokela, Rack Gallery, London, May -  July 1998
Johannes Phokela, I like my Neighbours, Johannesburg, South Africa; Gallery MOMO, 2009
Johannes Phokela, The World of the Sacred and the Profane, Johannesburg, South Africa; Gallery AOP, 2015
 Johannes Phokela, ONLY SUN IN THE SKY KNOWS HOW I FEEL – (A LUCID DREAM), Cape Town, Zeitz Mocaa Museum, 2021

References

1966 births
People from Soweto
South African male painters
South African contemporary artists
20th-century South African painters
20th-century male artists
21st-century South African painters
21st-century male artists
Alumni of the Royal College of Art
South African sculptors
Male sculptors
21st-century sculptors
20th-century sculptors
Living people